The Commandement des Forces Terrestres (CFT) is the new appellation (since July 1, 2008) of the Commandement de la Force d'action Terrestre (“Command of the land combat forces”, French acronym CFAT). It is the High command of the land forces of the French Army.

The CFT is under the orders of the État-major de l'armée de terre (EMAT). In 2016, it controls 2  "interarmes" (combined) divisions and 7 brigades. It has also direct control over a Corps-size HQ, the Rapid Reaction Corps - France. 

The CFT (then CFAT) was founded on the 30th of June 1998 from the disbanding III Corps and is garrisoned in Lille, at Kleber barracks. It employs 467 people:
 9 generals
 193 officers
 164 non-commissioned officers
 59 soldiers
 42 civilians
 187 reserve personnel

See also 
 Structure of the French Army

External links 
 Official page
 old CFAT page
 CRR-FR

Army units and formations of France
Commands of the French armed forces
Military units and formations established in 1998